Prychynenko may refer to

Denis Prychynenko (born 1992), German-Ukrainian footballer who has played for Heart of Midlothian 
Serhiy Prychynenko (born 1960), Ukrainian footballer, father of Denis
Stanislav Prychynenko (born 1991), Ukrainian International footballer who has played for SC Tavriya Simferopol
Volodymyr Prychynenko (born 1960), Ukrainian football coach and player, twin brother of Serhiy, father of Stanislav